Durispora is a genus of fungi in the family Valsaceae.

References

External links

Sordariomycetes genera
Diaporthales